Eddy Hollands (born 6 January 1973 in Wagin, Western Australia)  is an Australian Paralympic tandem cycling pilot, who won medals with the vision impaired rider Paul Clohessy.  He won a silver medal at the 1996 Atlanta Games in the Men's Individual Pursuit Tandem open event. At the 2000 Sydney Games, he won a bronze medal in the Men's 1 km Time Trial Tandem open event.

References

1973 births
Living people
Cyclists at the 1996 Summer Paralympics
Cyclists at the 2000 Summer Paralympics
Medalists at the 1996 Summer Paralympics
Medalists at the 2000 Summer Paralympics
Paralympic cyclists of Australia
Paralympic silver medalists for Australia
Paralympic bronze medalists for Australia
Paralympic sighted guides
People from Wagin, Western Australia
Australian male cyclists
Paralympic medalists in cycling